Cheung Chi Wai (born 6 May 1946) is a former professional footballer who spent the 1968 season in the North American Soccer League, playing for the Vancouver Royals.

Born in Hong Kong, in the British Empire to ethnic Chinese parents, Cheung Chi Wai represented Republic of China (Taiwan) instead of Hong Kong nor People's Republic of China.

Personal life
His father Chang King Hai, represented China at the 1948 Olympics.

His brother was fellow footballer Cheung Chi Doy.

References

External links
NASL career stats

Living people
1946 births
Hong Kong footballers
Taiwanese footballers
Hong Kong expatriate footballers
Hong Kong expatriates in Canada
Expatriate soccer players in Canada
Happy Valley AA players
Vancouver Royals players
North American Soccer League (1968–1984) players
Sing Tao SC players
Chinese Taipei international footballers
Chinese Taipei international footballers from Hong Kong
Association football forwards